Whitsunday, also known as  Whitsun, is the celebration in England of the Christian feast of Pentecost, observed 7 weeks after Easter.

Whitsunday, Whitsundays and Whit Sunday may also refer to:

 One of the Scottish term days, always falling in modern times on 15 May

Australia
 Whitsunday Islands, an island group in Queensland
 Whitsunday Islands National Park in Queensland
 Whitsunday Island, the largest of the Whitsunday Islands
 Whitsunday Region, a local government area located in North Queensland, Australia
 Whitsundays, Queensland, a locality in the Whitsunday Region which includes the Whitsunday Islands
 Electoral district of Whitsunday, an electoral division in the Legislative Assembly of Queensland, Australia
 Shire of Whitsunday, a former local government area located in North Queensland

See also 
 Whitsunday wire eel, found in Australia